The Foton Gratour ix5 (伽途ix5) is a mini MPV produced by Foton, a subsidiary of BAIC Group.

Overview

The Gratour ix5 was sold under the Gratour compact MPV product series with prices ranging from 41,900 yuan to 58,900 yuan.

The Foton Gratour ix5 was powered by a 1.2 liter inline-4 engine producing 88 hp or a 1.5 liter inline-4 engine producing 116 hp, with both engines mated to a 5-speed manual gear box.

Foton Gratour ix7

The Foton Gratour ix7 (伽途ix7) is essentially the Gratour ix5 with more ground clearance, extra plastic claddings and positioned higher in the market. Prices of the Gratour ix7 ranges from 53,900 yuan to 69,900 yuan.

The Foton Gratour ix7 was powered by the 1.5 liter inline-4 engine producing 116 hp from the Gratour ix5 mated to a 5-speed manual gear box.

References

External links 
 (Gratour ix5)
 (Gratour ix7)

Cars introduced in 2016
Minivans
Compact MPVs
Front-wheel-drive vehicles
Cars of China